Edsby is a cloud-based software application that combines social networking with class and student management features. It is a learning management system with data aggregation and analytics features for K-12 students, teachers, and parents.

History
Based in Toronto and originally named CoreFour, Edsby was founded in April 2010 by Steve Asbury, Jon Asbury, and Scott Welch, the three original founders and architects of the software application FirstClass, and co-worker John Myers. Edsby offers K-12 school districts online social learning tools connected to their existing systems, including gradebooks, attendance-taking, parent-teacher communication features, classroom management, content management and social classroom interaction.

Edsby is partnered with Microsoft and makes its service available on the Microsoft Azure cloud service worldwide. Microsoft enabled its OneNote application to support grade entry into the Edsby gradebook.

Customers
One Edsby site is the school district of Hillsborough County Public Schools. Edsby deployed to all 194,000 students and 15,000 teachers at the district's 260 schools in September, 2013.

Other district-wide deployments include 125,000 students, their parents and staff at York Region District School Board in 2017, 35,000 students and staff at Greater Essex County District School Board in 2016, and the 34,000 students and 3,450 staff at Kawartha Pine Ridge District School Board in 2015.

In March, 2019, in furtherance of a student information sharing exchange known as Te Rito, the New Zealand Ministry of Education contracted with Edsby to deliver two early stage roll-outs of the platform during 2019 and 2020, to test what the Ministry calls "critical elements of the functionality" of the exchange.

Awards
 2016 SIIA CODiE Award, Best Classroom Management Solution
 2017 SIIA CODiE Award, Best Education Data Solution

References

Educational technology companies of Canada
Canadian educational websites
Virtual learning environments
Canadian social networking websites
Learning management systems